is the 64th single by the J-pop group Morning Musume and was released on October 4, 2017. It is expected to be the second time the group will release a single under the name Morning Musume '17.

Members at time of single 
 9th generation: Mizuki Fukumura, Erina Ikuta
 10th generation: Haruna Iikubo, Ayumi Ishida, Masaki Sato, Haruka Kudo 
 11th generation: Sakura Oda
 12th generation: Haruna Ogata, Miki Nonaka, Maria Makino, Akane Haga
 13th generation: Kaede Kaga, Reina Yokoyama
 14th generation : Chisaki Morito

Background 
It is the group's first single to feature its sole 14th generation member, Chisaki Morito. It is the last single to feature 10th generation member, Haruka Kudo. Also the return of 10th generation member, Masaki Sato, after recovering from her injury. And lastly, this single celebrates the group's 20th anniversary.

Release 
It is a triple A-side single.

The single is released in eight versions: 3 CD-only regular editions and 5 CD+DVD limited editions. The first press of all regular editions comes with a trading card, randomly selected from three sets of 15 (one set of 15 cards for each edition). The limited edition SP includes a lottery card to win a ticket to one of special events held by the group. And the Kudo Haruka (Morning Musume '17) edition is released and is only available via forTUNE music which holds a bonus L-sized photo of her.

Track listings

CD

Charts and sales

References

External links 
 Profile at Hello! Project
 Profile at Up-Front Works

2017 singles
Zetima Records singles
Morning Musume songs
Japanese-language songs
Tropical house songs
Electronic songs
Electronic dance music songs
Billboard Japan Hot 100 number-one singles
Torch songs
Songs about bicycles